The Renault RE50 was the Formula One car with which the factory Renault team competed in the 1984 Formula One World Championship. The car was driven by Frenchman Patrick Tambay and Briton Derek Warwick, who joined the team from Ferrari and Toleman respectively; a third car was entered at the final race of the year in Portugal for test driver Philippe Streiff.

While the car was quick straight out of the box, it had a few problems that the team and drivers could not overcome. The Renault EF4 turbo engine was said to be powerful at  but usually proved too thirsty for either driver to challenge for more than 2nd or 3rd place at most races. This proved to be the same problem for other Renault engined cars such as the Lotus 95T (which was designed by former Renault designer Gérard Ducarouge who had joined Lotus in 1984). In 1984 Formula One cars were restricted to a maximum of 220 litres of fuel per race with the re-fueling of 1983 now banned and the French team never got on top of that problem despite a new and exciting (for 1984) electronic fuel monitoring device. The other main problem was that the car's tub which was somewhat fragile, despite being made of carbon fibre which was stronger than the traditional aluminium. This fragility saw Warwick injuring his legs in crashes at both Dijon and Monaco, while Tambay suffered a broken left leg after crashing into Warwick's already crashed car at the first corner of the race in Monaco. Both drivers were injured as a result of their cars suspension arms punching through the carbon fibre monocoque.

Over the season, Warwick achieved five points finishes (two second places, two thirds and a fourth) and Tambay four (one second place, two fifths and a sixth). Warwick finished seventh in the Drivers' Championship with 23 points while Tambay finished eleventh with 11; the combined 34 points placed Renault fifth in the Constructors' Championship. Additionally, both drivers set one fastest race lap each, while Tambay took the team's only pole position of the season at their home race in France, leading over half the race before finishing second behind the McLaren-TAG of eventual World Champion Niki Lauda.

Complete Formula One results
(key) (results in bold indicate pole position; results in italics indicate fastest lap)

References

External links

RE50
1984 Formula One season cars